, is a Japanese record label that is part of Sony Music Entertainment Japan. It is the successor of BMG Japan.

History
2008 – Ariola Japan becomes a subsidiary of Sony Music Entertainment.
2009 – Ariola Japan becomes a full-on record label separate from BMG Japan.

Artists
It is home to both former BMG Japan artists and new artists, including:

 Asai Kenichi & the Interchange Kills
 Ema
 Okamoto's
 Oh My Girl
Oh My Girl Banhana
 Qyoto
 King Gnu
Coalamode.
 Sayuri
Sherbets
 Seikima-II
Demon Kakka
Chehon
Denpa Girl
 Bakarhythm
 Ken Hirai
Boogieren
Brainchild's
Mashimaro
 Takako Matsu
 Yuuri
 Kep1er

iDEAK
 Toshiki Kadomatsu

Little Tokyo
 Kazumasa Oda

Rhythmedia Tribe
 Misia

Happy Song Records
 The Cro-Magnons
 The High-Lows

Former artists
 Aisha
 Ayano Mashiro
 AZU (managed by Avex)
 The Boyz (now with Universal Music Japan)
 Crossfaith
 Deen (managed by Being Inc.)
 fumika
 NGT48
 NU'EST
 Tatsuyuki Hiyamuta
 DAD MOM GOD
 One Day (JYP Entertainment/Ariola Japan)
 2AM
 2PM
 Rake
 Hiromi Sakimoto
 The Yellow Monkey
 Zeebra

Augusta Records
Joint venture with Office Augusta, which is now a subsidiary of Universal Music Japan
 Kyoko
 Yu Sakai
 Sukima Switch
 Takuya Ohashi
 Motohiro Hata

References

External links
 
 

 
Sony Music Entertainment Japan
Sony subsidiaries
Japanese record labels
Record labels established in 2000
Mass media companies based in Tokyo